Maxie Santillan Jr. (died 22 March 2022) was an American actor known for minor roles in Pirates of the Caribbean: The Curse of the Black Pearl and It's Always Sunny in Philadelphia. He is often credited as "Maxie J. Santillan Jr.".

Filmography

Film

Television

References

External links 

2022 deaths
Year of birth unknown
American male film actors
American male television actors
21st-century American male actors